The Ten Mile River is a river within the U.S. states of Massachusetts and Rhode Island.

The North Attleborough National Fish Hatchery is located in its upper reaches, and the river offers stocked trout fishing in the spring.

The Ten Mile River was badly polluted in the mid 1900s but has subsequently been remediated. Although there are still issues with metals and sediments in the water, the river and nearly all its tributaries are now designated as Class B waters (fishable, swimmable).

Course
The river begins at Savage Pond, near the corner of High and Chestnut Streets, in Plainville, Massachusetts. From there, it flows generally south through North Attleborough, Attleboro and Seekonk before entering Rhode Island and flowing through Pawtucket and East Providence where it flows over the Omega Dam into the Seekonk River.

Crossings
Below is a list of all crossings over the Ten Mile River. The list starts at the headwaters and goes downstream.
Plainville
High Street
Fuller Street
West Bacon Street
Cooney Avenue
North Attleborough
Broad Street
North Washington Street
Fisher Street
East Washington Street (U.S. 1) (Twice)
Chestnut Street
East Washington Street (U.S. 1)
Mount Hope Street
Towne Street
Freeman Street
Cedar Road
Attleboro
Interstate 295
Interstate 95
West Street
Water Street
Mechanic Street
Hodges Street
County Street (MA 123)
Wall Street
Olive Street
Lamb Street
Thacher Street
Tiffany Street
Bridge Street
Seekonk
Pond Street
Pawtucket
Central Avenue
Armistice Boulevard (RI 15)
East Providence
Newman Avenue (RI 152)
Pleasant Street
Pawtucket Avenue (U.S. 1A/RI 114)
North Broadway
Roger Williams Avenue
Providence & Worcester Railroad Bridge

Tributaries
In addition to many unnamed tributaries, the following brooks and rivers feed the Ten Mile:
Scotts Brook
East Branch Ten Mile River
Rattlesnake Brook
Bungay River
Thacher Brook
North Brook
South Brook
Sevenmile River
Hidden Hollow Brook
Daggett Farm Brook
Wilde River 
Coles Brook (not to be confused with Cole River)

Grassroots organizations
Friends of the Ten Mile and Bucklin Brook

See also
Boston and Providence Railroad Bridge
List of rivers in Massachusetts
List of rivers in Rhode Island
Seekonk River
Blackstone River

References

External links 
 Maps from the United States Geological Survey
 Friends of the Ten Mile and Bucklin Brook

External links
 Providence Journal video of Ten Mile River Greenway bike path

Rivers of Norfolk County, Massachusetts
Rivers of Bristol County, Massachusetts
Rivers of Providence County, Rhode Island
Rivers of Massachusetts
Rivers of Rhode Island
Plainville, Massachusetts
North Attleborough, Massachusetts
Attleboro, Massachusetts
Seekonk, Massachusetts
Pawtucket, Rhode Island
East Providence, Rhode Island
Tributaries of Providence River